The black-capped bulbul (Rubigula melanictera), or black-headed yellow bulbul, is a member of the bulbul family of passerine birds. It is endemic to Sri Lanka.

Taxonomy and systematics

The black-capped bulbul was originally described in the genus Muscicapa and later moved to Pycnonotus. Pycnonotus was found to be polyphyletic in recent molecular phylogenetic studies and five bulbul species, including the black-capped bulbul, moved to Rubigula.  
Until 2008, the black-capped bulbul was considered as conspecific with the black-crested, ruby-throated, flame-throated and Bornean bulbuls. Some authorities have considered the ruby-throated, flame-throated and Bornean bulbuls to be subspecies of the black-capped bulbul

Description

The black-capped bulbul is virtually crestless and has a yellow throat and brownish eyes. It is yellowish green above and yellow below. The tail is brownish and ends in a white tip. The male has red irides and the female has brown irides. Calls include a broad repertoire of sweet, mellow, minor-key piping whistles and sharper calls. Breeding records are from March to September.

Distribution and habitat

This is a bird of forest and dense scrub. It builds its nest in a bush; two to four eggs is a typical clutch. The black-capped bulbul feeds on fruit and insects. Found in forests, wooded areas and in gardens. Usually found in pairs.

In culture
In Sri Lanka, this bird is known as Hisa kalu Kondaya - හිස කලු කොන්ඩයා in Sinhala language.

References 

Rasmussen, P.C., and J.C. Anderton. 2005. Birds of South Asia. The Ripley guide. Volume 2: attributes and status. Smithsonian Institution and Lynx Edicions, Washington D.C. and Barcelona.

black-capped bulbul
Endemic birds of Sri Lanka
black-capped bulbul
black-capped bulbul
Taxobox binomials not recognized by IUCN